Sedyash-Nagayevo (Siźäş) is a rural locality (a village) in Uryush-Bittulinsky Selsoviet, Karaidelsky District, Bashkortostan, Russia. The population was 89 as of 2010. There are 12 streets.

Geography 
Sedyash-Nagayevo is located 58 km southwest of Karaidel (the district's administrative centre) by road. Shaushak is the nearest rural locality.

References 

Rural localities in Karaidelsky District